Benoît August (born 20 December 1976 in Mont-de-Marsan, Landes) is a French rugby union footballer, currently playing for Biarritz Olympique in the top division of French rugby, the Top 14. His usual position is at hooker. Prior to joining Biarritz he played for US Dax and Stade Français Paris. He was selected in the French national team's squad for the 2007 Six Nations, making his debut in the Test against Wales. That is still his only cap for his National Team.

Honours
 Stade Français
French Rugby Union Championship/Top 14: 2002–03, 2003–04

References

External links 
 Benoît August on ERCrugby.com
 RBS 6 Nations profile
 Benoît August on L'Equipe
 Benoît August International Statistics
 

1976 births
Living people
People from Mont-de-Marsan
Biarritz Olympique players
French rugby union players
France international rugby union players
Rugby union hookers
Stade Français players
Sportspeople from Landes (department)